Euphemia Elphinstone (also written Euphame or Eupheme; born 11 May 1509) was a mistress of James V of Scotland and the mother of his son Robert Stewart, 1st Earl of Orkney, born in 1532, as well as another child who died in childhood. One of her sons with her husband John Bruce was Laurence Bruce of Cultmalindie (1547–1617), the builder of Muness Castle.

She was the second daughter of Alexander Elphinstone, 1st Lord Elphinstone and Elizabeth Barlow or Barlay (c. 1476 – 10 September 1518), an English woman of the household of Margaret Tudor.

The family hailed from Elphinstone near Stirling. Her brother Alexander, Lord Elphinstone, died at Edinburgh following the Battle of Pinkie Cleugh.

Euphemia married John Bruce of Cultmalindie (c. 1507 – March 1547), and had five children: Laurence Bruce, Robert Bruce (born c. 1536), Henry Bruce (born c. 1538), James Bruce (born c. 1540) and Euphamie Bruce (born c. 1542). There is no firm evidence for any death date.

Her children and descendants were significant in the history of the Shetland Islands and Orkney Islands. Laurence Bruce and Robert Stewart and their families were to become closely entwined in the Shetland Islands, of which Laurence Bruce was appointed Sheriff by his half-brother.

According to legend, many people in the Shetland Islands are descended from her; in particular, those named Bruce are supposed to be descended from her children by John Bruce.

References

1509 births
1542 deaths
Mistresses of James V of Scotland
People associated with Orkney
People associated with Shetland
Daughters of barons